East Lancashire Cricket Club is a cricket club in the Lancashire League, which plays its home games at Alexandra Meadows in Blackburn. For the 2015 season its captain was Mark Bolton and its professional was Juan de Villiers. The club has been very successful, winning the League on 14 occasions, the Worsley Cup on 18 (more than any other club), the Inter League Club Challenge Trophy twice in its ten-year history, and has won a greater percentage of its games than any other club. It has employed professionals including Fazal Mahmood, Allan Border and Paul Reiffel.

Honours
1st XI League Winners - 14 - 1919, 1942, 1947, 1949, 1951, 1952, 1963, 1966, 1972, 1973, 1980, 1984, 1990, 2003
1st XI League Runners Up - 17 - 1896, 1901, 1913, 1916, 1943 (shared), 1944, 1945, 1946, 1969, 1983, 1988, 1991, 1996, 1997, 1998, 1999, 2001 
Worsley Cup Winners - 18 - 1925, 1929, 1933, 1947, 1949, 1951, 1952, 1961, 1966, 1968, 1971, 1980, 1981, 1983, 1987, 1988, 1998, 2007
Inter League Club Challenge Trophy Winners - 2 - 2004, 2006
20/20 Cup Winners - 1 - 2008
Ron Singleton Colne Trophy Winners - 3 - 1999, 2004 (shared), 2008
2nd XI League Winners - 13 - 1894, 1925 (shared), 1947, 1949, 1963 (shared), 1967, 1969, 1974, 1976, 1983, 1987, 1994, 2004
2nd XI League Runners Up - 5 - 1981, 1982, 1985, 1998, 2014
2nd XI (Lancashire Telegraph) Cup Winners - 6 - 1974, 1983, 1985, 1986, 1997, 2014
3rd XI League Winners - 1 - 1997
3rd XI League Runners Up - 3 - 2000, 2001, 2014

Team and player achievements
Highest League Time Cricket Score - 289 v Rawtenstall at Rawtenstall on 6 August 1906
Highest League Limited Overs Score - 326-4 v Todmorden at East Lancs on 12 June 2005
Highest Worsley Cup Time Cricket Score - 396 v Accrington at East Lancs on 28 June 1923
Highest Worsley Cup Limited Overs Score - 327-4 v Bacup at East Lancs on 28 May 2005
Highest Inter League Club Challenge Trophy Score - 311-4 v Enfield at East Lancs on 28 August 2006
Highest 20/20 Cup Score - 169-4 v Rishton at Rishton on 26 June 2009
Highest Individual League Score (Professional) - 151 - Quinton Friend v Church at Church on 1 August 2004
Highest Individual Worsley Cup Score (Professional) - 179* - Allan Border v Rawtenstall at Rawtenstall on 18 June 1978
Highest Individual League Score (Amateur) - 139 - David Pearson v Nelson at Nelson on 9 May 2010
Highest Individual Worsley Cup Score (Amateur) - 177* - Paul Turner v Bacup at East Lancs on 28 May 2005
Highest Individual 20/20 Cup Score (Professional) - 109* - Brendan Nash v Rishton at Rishton on 26 June 2009
Highest Individual 20/20 Cup Score (Amateur) - 99 - Paul Turner v Haslingden at Haslingden on 17 June 2005
Best Bowling Figures (Professional) - 9-22 - Loots Bosman v Colne at Colne on 1 May 2005 and Freddie Bull v Rawtenstall at East Lancs on 8 May 1907
Best Bowling Figures (Amateurs) - 9-19 - Jonathan Brooks v Accrington at Accrington on 23 September 1916
Best 20/20 Bowling Figures (Professional) - 4-11 - Ockert Erasmus v Accrington at East Lancs on 31 May 2013
Best 20/20 Bowling Figures (Amateur) - 6-20 - Minhaj Bhada v Rawtenstall at Rawtenstall on 26 June 2015
Amateur Batsmen with over 1,000 runs in a season - David Pearson - 1994, Paul Turner - 2003
Professional Batsmen with over 1,000 runs in a season - Kerry O'Keeffe - 1975, Allan Border - 1978, Johann Louw - 2003, Shanan Stewart - 2007
Amateur Bowlers with over 100 wickets in a season - Jonathan Brooks - 1916, J. Coulthurst - 1919
Professional Bowlers with over 100 wickets in a season - Billy Mitchell - 1902, Freddie Bull - 1907, Victor Norbury - 1912, 1913, Bill Merritt - 1934, 1935, Bruce Dooland - 1949, Fazal Mahmood - 1959, Ray Strauss - 1960, Paul Reiffel - 1990, Claude Henderson - 1999

References

External links
East Lancs CC at lancashireleague.com

Lancashire League cricket clubs
Sport in Blackburn